The South Korean pop duo TVXQ have embarked on seven headlining concert tours, one of which has been worldwide, and ten others that were based exclusively in Japan. TVXQ originally debuted as a five-member group in December 2003, with members U-Know Yunho, Max Changmin, Hero Jaejoong, Micky Yoochun, and Xiah Junsu. The group made their headlining debut in February 2006 through their Rising Sun Tour, performing four sell-out shows in South Korea, one show in Thailand, and one show in Malaysia, which was the first K-pop concert held in the country. They visited China and Taiwan for the first time for their O Tour, which commenced in January 2007. Their third and last concert tour as a quinet, the Mirotic Tour, was announced to tour cities beyond South Korea, China, and Thailand throughout 2009 and 2010, but the remaining concert dates were cancelled soon after members Jaejoong, Yoochun, and Junsu entered a legal battle with their Korean agency S.M. Entertainment, subsequently leading to their departure. In January 2011, TVXQ restarted their activities as a duo, with remaining members Yunho and Changmin.

The duo held their first worldwide concert, the Catch Me: Live World Tour from November 2012 to July 2013, visiting North America and South America for the first time. In December 2014, the duo celebrated their tenth debut anniversary with the Tistory: Special Live Tour, touring cities in South Korea, China, and Thailand. It was the duo's last headlining concert tour before taking their indefinite hiatus to enlist in South Korea's compulsory military service. Since the completion of their service, TVXQ have headlined three concert tours, two of which were exclusively based in Japan. They performed in Korea, Thailand, Hong Kong, and Indonesia with the Circle – #welcome tour from May 2018 to August 2019.

TVXQ's international concert tours often overlapped with their Japanese concert tours. The duo's Japanese tours have set numerous records: they were the first Korean music act to headline a five-Dome tour, the first foreign music act to hold a concert in Japan's largest venue, the Nissan Stadium, and the first and only foreign act to attract over 1 million people on a Japanese tour. Their 2013 Time Tour was the largest, most-attended, and highest-grossing concert series ever held by a foreign music act in Japan at the time; it grossed US$93 million in concert tickets and attracted over 850,000 people. The duo set new attendance and revenue records in 2017 with their Begin Again Tour, mobilizing over 1.28 million fans and grossing US$110 million in ticket sales, as well as becoming the first and only foreign act to play at the Nissan Stadium for three consecutive days.

Rising Sun Tour

The 1st Concert: Rising Sun, also known as The 1st Asia Tour: Rising Sun, was the debut concert tour by South Korean pop group TVXQ, launched in support of the group's second Korean studio album, Rising Sun (2005). The tour had six dates in Asia, starting with four shows in Seoul, South Korea from February 10 to 13, 2006 at the Olympic Gymnastics Arena. The last show on February 13 was filmed and recorded for the CD and DVD release; the CD was released on July 12, 2006, and the VCD and DVD were released on January 18, 2007. The release came with additional concert and backstage footage, interviews, a behind-the-scenes making, and a 50-page photobook.

The tour's first overseas stop was in Kuala Lumpur, Malaysia on July 14, performing to 15,000 fans in the Putra Indoor Stadium. TVXQ were the first Korean music act to headline a concert in the country. Labelmates Super Junior opened the concert with a performance of their single, "U."

The Rising Sun Tour featured solo performances of each TVXQ member. Xiah Junsu performed a cover of Blue's 2001 debut single "All Rise" and invited Super Junior member Eunhyuk to perform as a guest rapper. Max Changmin covered Michael Jackson's "The Way You Make Me Feel", but due to copyright restrictions, his performance was cut off from the CD and DVD setlist.

Guest acts
Eunhyuk 
Super Junior 

Setlist

O Tour

Mirotic Tour

TVXQ! The 3rd Asia Tour “Mirotic” was the third international concert tour of the South Korean pop group TVXQ!, in line with their fourth studio album, Mirotic. The tour marked the return of TVXQ! after performing the 2007-08 TVXQ! The 2nd Asia Tour Concert “O” and the final tour involving all five members of the group before the split-up. The tour commenced with 3 shows in Seoul in February 2009 and continued onto Nanjing, Bangkok, Beijing and Shanghai.

Jaejoong covered Deulgukhwa’s "It’s Only My World”, a song from 1985. Changmin performed a Christian cover song, “Upon This Rock” by Sandi Patty. “Xiahtic” was self-composed, written and arranged by Junsu specifically for his solo performance. SHINee’s Key, being a special guest, performed the rap for this song for the shows in Seoul, Nanjing, Beijing and Shanghai. In Bangkok, Yoochun took over Key’s part due to his inability to attend the concert. Yunho sung an upbeat song of his own composition, “Checkmate”, throughout the whole tour. Yoonchun also performed "Love by love", a self-composed song. On July 31, 2009, the live CD that was recorded from February 20 to 22, 2009 was first released, while the DVD was released on December 30, 2009.

“Xiahtic” and “Checkmate” were later released in Japanese as B-sides for the 29th single Break Out! and 30th single Toki Wo Tomete, respectively in 2010. Break Out! was released in Japan on January 21 and Toki Wo Tomete on March 24 as the last release of TVXQ! as a five-member group.

Setlist

Note:
The show at the Shenzhen Stadium in China scheduled on November 21 was cancelled due to Jaejoong, Junsu, and Yoonchun's legal dispute with SM Entertainment

Catch Me Tour

Tistory Tour

Tistory: Special Live Tour (stylized as TVXQ! Special Live Tour – T1ST0RY), also known as the tenth anniversary tour, was the fifth world concert tour (twelfth overall) by South Korean pop duo TVXQ. The set list consisted of TVXQ's greatest hits. The tour was the duo's last headlining concert tour before taking their hiatus to enlist in South Korea's compulsory military service.

The name "Tistory" (T1ST0RY; pronounced "tee-story") is coined from the combination of the letter "T" (from "TVXQ") and the word "history." The "i" and "o" in the word "history" is replaced with the numbers "1" and "0" to symbolize the duo's tenth year. The concert was produced by Shim Jae-won and promoted by Dreammaker Entertainment in South Korea.

Background
TVXQ's tenth anniversary promotions started in December 2013, when they held a two-day special concert to commemorate their decade in the Korean music industry. The concert, titled Time Slip, was part of S.M. Entertainment's winter music festival SMTown Week. Time Slip was held in Seoul's Olympic Gymnastics Arena on December 26 and 27, 2013.

The two encore shows were called T1ST0RY &...! and was held at the Olympic Gymnastics Arena from June 13 and 14, 2015.

Broadcasts and recordings
The first two concerts in Seoul, South Korea were filmed. The DVD, which also includes behind-the-scene footage and a 100-page photobook, was released on May 29, 2015.

The final encore concert on June 14, 2015, was broadcast live at the multi-complexes S.M. COEX Artium in Seoul, South Korea and Studio Coast in Tokyo, Japan. It sold 100,000 tickets in total, grossing approximately US$4 million. The concert film was re-released at the S.M. COEX Artium with surround viewing features on July 10.

On December 26, TVXQ's twelfth anniversary, S.M. debuted the TVXQ! Special Hologram Concert 'T1ST0RY &…!’ + α at the SMTOWN Theatre. The virtual concert, which features TVXQ performing in projected screens, is approximately 35 minutes long. The set list includes "Spellbound", "Humanoids", "Catch Me", "Keep Your Head Down", "Something", and "Ten".

{{hidden
| headercss  = background: lavender; font-size: 100%; width: 65%;
| contentcss = text-align: left; font-size: 100%; width: 75%;
| header     = Set list in Seoul (2014)
| content    = 

 "Catch Me"
 "Double Trouble"
 "Rising Sun (순수)" (Remix)
 "그 대신 내가 (Beside)"
 "갈증 (Smoky Heart)"
 Max Changmin solo: "Heaven's Day" 
 "믿기 싫은 이야기 (How Can I)"
 "Love in the Ice" (Korean version)
 "오늘밤 (Moonlight Fantasy)"
 "너의 남자 (Your Man)"
 "뒷모습 (Steppin')" / "Destiny" / "Off Road"
 "Love Again"
 U-Know Yunho solo: "Bang"
 Acoustic ballad medley part 1: "믿어요 (Believe)" / "My Little Princess (있잖아요...)" / "You Only Love" / "Tonight"
 Acoustic ballad medley part 2: "낙원 (Paradise)" / "She" / "넌 나의 노래 (You're My Melody)"
 "Rise..."
 "Android" (Korean version) / "Humanoids"
 "B.U.T (Be-Au-Ty)" (Korean version)
 "I Don't Know" (Korean version)
 "Show Me Your Love"
 "Crazy Love"
 "Somebody to Love" (Korean version)
 "Something"
 "수리수리 (Spellbound)"
 "왜 (Keep Your Head Down)"
Encore
 "Ten (10 Years)"
 "Here I Stand"
 "항상 곁에 있을게 (Always With You)"

}}

{{hidden
| headercss  = background: lavender; font-size: 100%; width: 65%;
| contentcss = text-align: left; font-size: 100%; width: 75%;
| header     = Encore set list in Seoul (2015)
| content    = 

 "Catch Me"
 "Maximum"
 "Rising Sun (순수)" (Remix)
 "그 대신 내가 (Beside)"
 "갈증 (Smoky Heart)"
 Max Changmin solo: "Heaven's Day"
 "믿기 싫은 이야기 (How Can I)"
 "Love in the Ice" (Korean version)
 "오늘밤 (Moonlight Fantasy)"
 "너의 남자 (Your Man)"
 "뒷모습 (Steppin')" / "Destiny" / "Off Road"
 "Love Again"
 U-Know Yunho solo: "Champagne"
 Acoustic ballad medley part 1: "믿어요 (Believe)" / "My Little Princess (있잖아요...)" / "You Only Love" / "Tonight"
 Acoustic ballad medley part 2: "Drive" / "Hi Ya Ya" / "The Way U Are" / "넌 나의 노래 (You're My Melody)"
 "Starlight"
 "Rise..."
 "Android" (Korean version) / "Humanoids"
 "O-Jung.Ban.Hap." 
 "Mirotic"
 "Crazy Love"
 "Balloons"
 "Somebody to Love" (Korean version)
 "Something"
 "수리수리 (Spellbound)"
 "왜 (Keep Your Head Down)"
Encore
 "Ten (10 Years)"
 "Here I Stand"
 "항상 곁에 있을게 (Always With You)"
Double encore
 "Hug"

}}

Notes
A In the last two encore performances for Seoul, Donghae & Eunhyuk joined Changmin on stage for the show on June 13. EXO members Xiumin, Chen, and Baekhyun were the guest performers on June 14.

Circle Tour

The Circle Tour is the sixth concert tour by the South Korean pop duo TVXQ. The tour's first concert, Circle – #welcome (stylized as TVXQ! CONCERT -CIRCLE- #welcome) was held at the Jamsil Supplementary Stadium in Seoul, South Korea on May 5, 2018. It was the duo's first concert in South Korea in 2 years and 11 months. The tour also performed shows in Hong Kong and Bangkok, Thailand.

The encore tour titled Circle – #with (stylized as TVXQ! CONCERT -CIRCLE- #with) opened in Seoul on the KSPO Dome on March 9, 2019. It went on to have shows in Hong Kong, Bangkok, Jakarta, Indonesia and Taipei, Taiwan. The DVD for Circle – #welcome was released on March 27, 2019.

Cancelled shows

Beyond the T

Japan tours

Showcases

Rising Sun Showcase

The 3rd Album "O"-Jung.Ban.Hap. Showcase

Giving Young Adults Dreams And Hope- "TVXQ’s Fall Mini Concert"

TVXQ! Welcome Back Party "The Chance Of Love"

Fan meetings

Cassiopeia Special Day With TVXQ

5th Anniversary Special Party

Cassiopeia Special Day With TVXQ 2013

2020 TVXQ Online Fanmeeting "Dong, Bang, Shin Ki with Cassiopeia"

TVXQ! Special Comeback Live - YouR PresenT

References

 
Lists of concert tours
Lists of concert tours of South Korean artists
Lists of events in South Korea
South Korean music-related lists
K-pop concerts by artist